The IPW:UK All-England Championship (formerly the FWA All-England Championship) was a professional wrestling championship which was originally contested for in Frontier Wrestling Alliance (FWA) and subsequently in International Pro Wrestling: United Kingdom (IPW:UK) after FWA's closure. The title was established in 2001 and existed for eight years until it was unified with the IPW:UK Championship in September 2009. The IPW:UK Championship and the All-England Championship were de-unified in 2012 through until the company closing in 2017.

History

FWA
The genesis of the All-England title had its roots in the weekly FWA TV show on Portsmouth's MyTV channel in the summer of 2001. With the main FWA title held by Doug Williams, and Williams in a storyline dispute with the promotion's commissioner, Victoria De Montfort, a decision was made to focus on a secondary belt as a TV championship. At the time, the FWA had been using the FWA European Union Championship as a secondary title, and with the company's ownership keen on promoting a particularly English flavour to the show, the title was renamed the All-England championship, a nod to the organisation running the Wimbledon tennis championships.

Scottie Rock, the last-recognised EU Champion, had been coming to the ring wearing the belt, which at that point was not recognised on the TV show. This was explained away as being a "gypsy fighting championship" belt by the commentary team. Nevertheless, Rock and Johnny Storm were chosen to compete for the initial championship, won by Storm in Portsmouth in July 2001.

The championship was initially envisaged as being a Brits-only competition. However, Ahmed Chaer, a Turkish-German wrestler from the German Stampede Wrestling promotion, was given the title to cement a short-lived alliance between the two promotions, though he lost it on his first defence a week later, to Paul Travell. Although the belt would then revert to its homegrown roots, the American Chris Hamrick would also later hold the title.

IPW:UK 
Former champion Leroy Kincade, who defeated Hade Vansen on 19 October 2005, was stripped of the title on 19 November 2006 after siding with International Pro Wrestling: United Kingdom in an inter-promotional feud with FWA. Kincade first put his title reign in jeopardy on October 7 of that year by competing in an unsanctioned All-England Title defence at an IPW:UK show. Even though FWA had a working relationship with the promotion, and Kincade in fact retained the title, FWA refused to recognise the result of the match as the FWA management team did not agree for IPW:UK to use the All-England Title name and belt on their show. This continued with Kincade repeatedly siding with IPW:UK and scheduling his own title defences before finally being stripped of the FWA All-England Championship.

Kincade continued to defend the belt even though not officially being champion. However the next official champion would be FWA loyalist Iceman who defeated Kincade at an IPW show. Prior to the match, the FWA announced it would sanction the Title match only if Iceman won.

During the Final Frontiers show, IPW:UK wrestler Sam Slam won the title from Iceman. However, this show also saw IPW:UK win the inter-promotional feud and put FWA out of business, leaving the titles status unclear. FWA would also revive itself as XWA but would sever all ties with the All-England Championship. The title would continue to operate in IPW:UK for just under two years, being part of the British National Championship tournament in 2008, until it was unified into the IPW:UK Championship.

On 15 September 2012, Sha Samuels, holder of the IPW:UK Championship, un-unified the IPW:UK World and IPW:UK All-England belts, putting the All-England title back into active duty through until the company's closure in September 2017.

Title history 

The title was declared vacant and retired on 24 September 2017.

Combined reigns

See also

Professional wrestling in the United Kingdom

References

External links
Official All-England Title History
 IPW All England Championship

National professional wrestling championships
2001 establishments in England
Professional wrestling in England